Bigley is a surname. Notable people with the name include:

 Billy Bigley (born 1962), American racing driver 
 Isabel Bigley (1926–2006), American actress
 Kenneth Bigley (1942–2004), British civil engineer 
 Kevin Bigley (born 1986), American actor

See also
 Bagley (surname)